Pancaldi may refer to:

 11120 Pancaldi, minor planet
 Pangaltı, Istanbul
 Giuliano Pancaldi (born 1946), an Italian historian of science